A microstate or ministate is a sovereign state having a very small population or very small land area, usually both. However, the meanings of "state" and "very small" are not well-defined in international law. Some recent attempts to define microstates have focused on identifying qualitative features that are linked to their size and population, such as partial delegation of their sovereignty to larger states, such as for international defense.

Commonly accepted examples of microstates include Andorra, Liechtenstein, Monaco, Nauru, Palau, San Marino and Tuvalu. The smallest political entity recognized as a sovereign state is Vatican City, with fewer than 1,000 residents and an area of only . Some microstates – such as Monaco and Vatican City – are city-states consisting of a single municipality.

Definitions

Quantitative 
Most scholars identify microstates by using a quantitative threshold and applying it to either one variable (such as the size of its territory or population) or a composite of different variables. While it is agreed that microstates are the smallest of all states, there is no consensus on what variable (or variables) or what cut-off point should be used to determine which political units should be labelled as "microstates" (as opposed to small "normal" states). According to some scholars the quantitative approach to defining microstates suffers from such problems as "inconsistency, arbitrariness, vagueness and inability to meaningfully isolate qualitatively distinct political units".

- 
-

Qualitative 
Some academics have suggested defining microstates according to the unique features that are linked to their geographic or demographic smallness. Newer approaches have proposed looking at the behaviour or capacity to operate in the international arena in order to determine which states should deserve the microstate label. Yet, it has been argued that such approaches could lead to either confusing microstates with weak states (or failed states) or relying too much on subjective perceptions.

An alternative approach is to define microstates as "modern protected states". According to the definition proposed by Dumienski (2014): "microstates are modern protected states, i.e. sovereign states that have been able to unilaterally depute certain attributes of sovereignty to larger powers in exchange for benign protection of their political and economic viability against their geographic or demographic constraints." Adopting this approach permits limiting the number of microstates and separating them from both small states and autonomies or dependencies. Examples of microstates understood as modern protected states include such states as Liechtenstein, San Marino, Monaco, Niue, Andorra, the Cook Islands or Palau.

The smallest political unit recognized as a sovereign state is the Vatican City, though its precise status is sometimes disputed, e.g., Maurice Mendelson argued in 1972 that "[i]n two respects it may be doubted whether the territorial entity, the Vatican City, meets the traditional criteria of statehood".

Politics 
Statistical research has shown that microstates are more likely to be democracies than larger states. In 2012, Freedom House classified 86% of the countries with less than 500,000 inhabitants as "free". This shows that countries with small populations often had a high degree of political freedom and civil liberties, which is one of the hallmarks of democracies. Some scholars have taken the statistical correlation between small size and democracy as a sign that smallness is beneficial to the development of a democratic political system, mentioning social cohesiveness, opportunities for direct communication and homogeneity of interests as possible explanations for why this is the case.

Case study research, however, has led researches to believe that the statistical evidence belies the anti-democratic elements of microstate politics. Due to small populations, family and personal relations are often decisive in microstate politics. In some cases, this impedes neutral and formal decision-making and instead leads to undemocratic political activity, such as clientelism, corruption, particularism and executive dominance. While microstates often have formal institutions that are associated with democracy, the inner workings of politics in microstates are in reality often undemocratic.

The high number of democracies amongst microstates could be explained by their colonial history. Most microstates adopted the same political system as their colonial ruler. Because of the high number of microstates that were British colonies in the past, microstates often have a majoritarian and parliamentary political system similar to the Westminster system. Some microstates with a history as British colony have implemented some aspects of a consensus political system, to adapt to their geographic features or societal make-up. While the colonial history often determines what political systems microstates have, they do implement changes to better accommodate their specific characteristics.

Microstates and international relations 
Microstates often rely on other countries in order to survive, as they have a small military capacity and a lack of resources. This had led some researchers to believe that microstates are forced to subordinate themselves to larger states which reduces their sovereignty. Research, however, has shown that microstates strategically engage in patron-client relationships with other countries. This allows them to trade some privileges to countries that can advance their interests the most. Examples of this are microstates that establish a tax haven or sell their support in international committees in exchange for military and economic support.

Historical anomalies and aspirant states 
A small number of tiny sovereign political units have been founded on historical anomalies or eccentric interpretations of law. These types of states, often labelled as "microstates," are usually located on small (usually disputed) territorial enclaves, generate limited economic activity founded on tourism and philatelic and numismatic sales, and are tolerated or ignored by the nations from which they claim to have seceded.

The Republic of Indian Stream – now the town of Pittsburg, New Hampshire – was a geographic anomaly left unresolved by the Treaty of Paris that ended the U.S. Revolutionary War, and claimed by both the U.S. and Canada. Between 1832 and 1835, the area's residents refused to acknowledge either claimant.

The Cospaia Republic became independent through a treaty error and survived from 1440 to 1826. Its independence made it important in the introduction of tobacco cultivation to Italy.

Couto Misto was disputed by Spain and Portugal, and operated as a sovereign state until the 1864 Treaty of Lisbon partitioned the territory, with the larger part becoming part of Spain.

Jaxa was a small state that existed during the 17th century at the border between Tsardom of Russia and Qing China. Despite its location in East Asia, the state's primary language was Polish.

See also 

 City-state
 European microstates
 Free State of Fiume
 Free Territory of Trieste
 Island country
 List of countries and dependencies by population density
 List of countries and outlying territories by total area
 List of countries by population
 Microstates and the United Nations
 Neutral Moresnet

References

Further reading 
 

 
Types of countries